Aristocrates (in Greek Aριστoκρατης; lived 4th century BC) was a person against whom Demosthenes wrote an oration, still extant, entitled Against Aristocrates (Kατα Aριστoκρατoυς). He wrote it shortly before 352 BC for Euthycles, who accused Aristocrates of proposing an illegal decree in relation to Charidemus, a Euboean adventurer who acted as chief minister for the Thracian prince Cersobleptes and desired to assume with Athenian help full control of king Cotys former dominions.

References
Demosthenes, Speeches, A. T. Murray (translator); Cambridge, MA - London, (1939), "Against Aristocrates"
Smith, William; Dictionary of Greek and Roman Biography and Mythology, "Aristocrates (4)", Boston, (1867)

4th-century BC Athenians